Daedalus was a figure in Greek mythology.

Daedalus or Daedelus may also refer to:

Literature
 Stephen Dedalus or Daedalus, the hero of James Joyce's A Portrait of the Artist as a Young Man and a character in Ulysses.
 Daedalus (novel), a 2003 Star Trek: Enterprise novel.
 Daedalus; or, Science and the Future, a book by J. B. S. Haldane, 1924

Entertainment
 Daedalus (band), an Italian progressive metal band
 Daedelus (musician) (Alfred Weisberg-Roberts, born 1977), American musician and producer
 Daedalus (sculpture), public art work by Charles Ginnever
 Daedalus (Stargate), a spacecraft in Stargate SG-1
 "Daedalus" (Star Trek: Enterprise), an episode of the TV series
 Daedalus (Deus Ex character), in the video game
 Daedalus (fictional inventor), created by New Scientist columnist David E. H. Jones

Science
 Daedalus (crater), on the far side of the Moon
 Daedalus (journal), of the American Academy of Arts and Sciences
 Daedalus (trace fossil)
 1864 Daedalus, an asteroid

Transportation
 Daedalus (yacht)
 , the name of several ships and shore establishments
 , an American landing craft repair ship
 Daedalus, a merchant ship that took part in the Vancouver Expedition (1791–1795)
 Daedalus Flight Pack, a British jet pack
 MIT Daedalus, an American human-powered aircraft

Other
 Daedalus (horse), winner of the 1794 Epsom Derby
 Daedalus Books, an American book seller
 Daedalus Reef

See also

 Dedalus (disambiguation)
 Daedalus Project (disambiguation)